Hoplias australis is a predatory freshwater characin fish of the southern Neotropics.

Distribution
Southern South America, throughout the Rio Uruguay basin, including its tributary Rio Negro, Uruguay where it is endemic.

Taxonomy
Osvaldo Oyakawa and George Mattox described Hoplias austalis at the same time as Hoplias curupira.

References

Fish of South America
Erythrinidae
Fish described in 2009